Nikita Khlystov (born July 23, 1993) is a Russian professional ice hockey defenceman. He is currently playing for HC 21 Prešov in Slovak Extraliga.

Khlystov made his Kontinental Hockey League debut playing with Traktor Chelyabinsk during the 2013–14 KHL season.

On 1 May 2020, Khlystov joined his sixth KHL club, after he was traded by Severstal Cherepovets in exchange for financial compensation.

References

External links

1993 births
Living people
HC Kunlun Red Star players
Metallurg Magnitogorsk players
Metallurg Novokuznetsk players
Russian ice hockey defencemen
Severstal Cherepovets players
Traktor Chelyabinsk players
HC Yugra players
People from Magnitogorsk
Sportspeople from Chelyabinsk Oblast
HC 21 Prešov players
Russian expatriate sportspeople in China
Russian expatriate sportspeople in Slovakia
Expatriate ice hockey players in China
Expatriate ice hockey players in Slovakia
Russian expatriate ice hockey people